Scopula polyterpes is a moth of the  family Geometridae. It is found in China (including Hainan).

References

Moths described in 1920
polyterpes
Moths of Asia